Bekwai is one of the constituencies represented in the Parliament of Ghana. It elects one Member of Parliament (MP) by the first past the post system of election. Joseph Osei-Owusu is the member of parliament for the constituency. He was elected as an Independent Candidate. He is a member of the New Patriotic Party but contested as an Independent candidate after losing in the election as a New Patriotic candidate. He won a majority of 34,700 votes to become the MP. He succeeded Ignatius Kofi Poku Edusei who had represented the constituency on the ticket of the New Patriotic Party (NPP)

See also
List of Ghana Parliament constituencies

References 

Parliamentary constituencies in the Ashanti Region